La Place is a census-designated place and unincorporated community in Cerro Gordo Township, Piatt County, Illinois, United States. As of the 2010 census, its population was 259.

Geography

Demographics

References

Census-designated places in Piatt County, Illinois
Census-designated places in Illinois
Unincorporated communities in Piatt County, Illinois
Unincorporated communities in Illinois